is a single that the Japanese female idol group Momoiro Clover Z released under the alias of . The single was published in Japan on September 5, 2012.

Details 

The first verse of the song is simply the full name of Japanese folktale character Jugemu.

The title track is an ending theme for the anime Joshiraku. The Yoshida Brothers accompany with shamisens.

Reception 
The CD single debuted at 6th place in the Oricon Weekly Singles Chart.

Since its release, the song was popular between Joshiraku fans and also from anime fans in general (since it was Joshiraku's ending credits rollout song), but in late March 2021, the song became worldwide popular seemingly out of nowhere, since a lot of mini-clips from TikTok came out imitating the now iconic side to side shake hip scene at the start and end of the ending credits roll out. This sudden popularity went so far that after 9 years,  Momoiro Clover Z made a music video based on the song, resembling almost exactly the ending video from the anime originally came from.

Track listing

Chart performance

References

External links 
 

2012 singles
Japanese-language songs
Momoiro Clover Z songs
King Records (Japan) singles
Songs written by Kenichi Maeyamada
2012 songs